Jonathan Eric Bardon  (born in Dublin, 1941 – died in Belfast, 21 April 2020), was an Irish historian and author.

Early life
Bardon was born in Dublin in 1941 and graduated from Trinity College, Dublin (TCD), in 1963. Shortly thereafter, in 1964, he moved to Belfast to begin his teaching career at Orangefield Boys Secondary School. While in Belfast, he enrolled at Queens University, Belfast, where he received a Diploma in Education, also in 1964. Living in Northern Ireland as a young man during the beginning of the Troubles, he credits two things that piqued his fascination with it, while remaining nonpolitical: his early teaching experiences educating young boys, both Catholic and Protestant, in Belfast; and a five feature commission he received from the now-defunct Sunday Times to write about and research the Battle of the Somme.

Career
Bardon is best known for his critically acclaimed text, A History of Ulster.  The book examines, in detail, the cultural, social, economic, and political arenas of the province, beginning with the early settlements and progressing linearly to present-day Ulster.

He has also written numerous radio and television programmes on the subject of Northern Ireland.  Most recently he was commissioned by BBC Radio to create a two hundred and forty-episode series entitled A Short History of Ireland.  The final episode aired on 18 March 2007.

In 2002, Bardon was appointed an OBE for "services to community life".

Bardon died in Belfast on 21 April 2020, having contracted COVID-19. He already had underlying health issues, including lung cancer.

Bibliography
A History of Ulster.  Blackstaff Press, 1992.
A History of Ireland in 250 Episodes. 2008.
Belfast: A Century.  Blackstaff Press, 1999.
Belfast: An Illustrated History.  Blackstaff Press, 1982.
Belfast:  1000 Years.  Blackstaff Press, 1985.
Beyond the Studio: A History of BBC Northern Ireland.  Blackstaff Press, 2000.
Dublin: One Thousand Years of Wood Quay.  Blackstaff Press, 1988. (co-authored with Stephen Conlin).
The Plantation Of Ulster.  Gill and Macmillan, 2011.
A Narrow Sea: The Irish-Scottish Connection in 120 Episodes. Gill Books, 2018.

References

20th-century Irish historians
21st-century Irish historians
Officers of the Order of the British Empire
1941 births
2020 deaths